The Fourth River is an American literary magazine with a focus on nature and place-based writing.

History and profile
Established in 2005 by the MFA Program in Creative Writing at Chatham University in Pittsburgh, Pennsylvania, the journal is edited by graduate students and Chatham faculty. Publication is annual as a quality paperback and twice monthly in its online format.

The Fourth River takes its name from a subterranean river beneath Pittsburgh, a city famously sited at the confluence of three rivers: Monongahela, Allegheny, and Ohio. The fourth river, unseen yet indispensable to the city's riverine ecosystem, is actually an aquifer geologists call the "Wisconsin Glacial Flow". Founding editor and poet Jeffrey Thomson wrote in first issue that the genesis of The Fourth River is the idea that “between and beneath the visible framework of the human world and the built environment, there exist deeper currents of force and meaning supporting the very structure of that world". The journal also takes inspiration from Rachel Carson, the biologist, zoologist, and nature writer who is one of Chatham's most notable alumnae.

Masthead
Executive Editor: Sheryl St. Germain

Editor-in-Chief: Sheila Squillante

Managing Editor: Kelly Kepner

Fiction Editor: Marc Nieson

Nonfiction Editor: Sheila Squillante

Poetry Editor: Heather McNaugher

Past contributors
Contributors to the journal include:
 Michael Byers
 Astrid Cabral
 Peter Cole
 Robert Hass
 Terrance Hayes
 Ted Kooser
 Phillip Lopate
 Dinty W. Moore
 Naomi Shihab Nye
 Claudia Rankine
 Janisse Ray
 Mary Swander
 Judith Vollmer

External links
 The Fourth River

Biannual magazines published in the United States
Literary magazines published in the United States
Student magazines published in the United States
Chatham University
Magazines established in 2005
Magazines published in Pittsburgh